FC Trudovye Rezervy-RIPO Minsk was a football club based in Minsk, Belarus.

History
The club was founded as a partnership between Minsk branch of Trudovye Rezervy Sport Society and Republican Institute for Vocational Education (Respublikanskiy Institut Professionalnogo Obrazovaniya). In 2001 they joined Belarusian Second League, where they only played for one season. In 2002 the club merged with FC Traktor Minsk to form MTZ-RIPO Minsk.

Performance history
{|class="wikitable"
|-bgcolor="#efefef"
! Season
! League
! Pos.
! Pl.
! W
! D
! L
! GS
! GA
! P
!Cup
!Notes
!Manager
|-
|align=right|2001
|align=right bgcolor=#98bb98|3D
|align=right|15
|align=right|34||align=right|11||align=right|7||align=right|16
|align=right|53||align=right|47||align=right|40
|
|align=right|
|
|}

External links
Profile at footballfacts.ru

Defunct football clubs in Belarus
FC Partizan Minsk
2002 disestablishments in Belarus
Association football clubs disestablished in 2002